"Ice Ice Baby" is the debut single by American rapper Vanilla Ice, K. Kennedy and DJ Earthquake. It was based on the bassline of the song "Under Pressure" by British rock band Queen and British singer David Bowie, who did not receive songwriting credit or royalties until after it had become a hit. Released on Vanilla Ice’s debut album, To the Extreme (1990), it is his best-known song. It has appeared in remixed form on Platinum Underground and Vanilla Ice Is Back! A live version appears on the album Extremely Live, while a nu metal version appears on the album Hard to Swallow, under the title "Too Cold".

"Ice Ice Baby" was first released as the B-side to Vanilla Ice's cover of "Play That Funky Music", but the single was not initially successful. When disc jockey David Morales played "Ice Ice Baby" instead, it began to gain success. "Ice Ice Baby" was the first hip-hop single to top the Billboard Hot 100. Outside of the United States, "Ice Ice Baby" topped the charts in Australia, Belgium, the Netherlands, New Zealand, the Republic of Ireland, and the United Kingdom, thus helping the song diversify hip hop by introducing it to a mainstream audience.

Lyrics and music

Robert Van Winkle, better known by his stage name Vanilla Ice, wrote "Ice Ice Baby" in 1983 at the age of 16, basing its lyrics upon his experiences in South Florida. The lyrics describe a shooting and Van Winkle's rhyming skills. The chorus of "Ice Ice Baby" originates from the signature chant of the national African American fraternity Alpha Phi Alpha. Of the song's lyrics, Van Winkle stated in a 2001 interview that "If you released 'Ice Ice Baby' today, it would fit in today's lyrical respect among peers, you know what I'm sayin'? [...] My lyrics aren't, 'Pump it up, go! Go!' At least I'm sayin' somethin'."

The song's hook samples the bassline of the 1981 song "Under Pressure" by Queen and David Bowie, who did not receive credit or royalties for the sample. In a 1990 interview, Van Winkle claimed the two melodies were slightly different because he had added an additional note on the "and" of the fourth beat. In later interviews, Van Winkle readily admitted he sampled the song and claimed his 1990 statement was a joke; others, however, suggested he had been serious. After representatives for Queen and Bowie threatened a copyright infringement suit against him, the matter was settled out of court, with Van Winkle being required to pay financial recompense to the original artists. Bowie and all members of Queen were also given songwriting credit for the sample. "Ice Ice Baby" is written in the key of D minor.

In December 1990, Van Winkle told British youth music magazine Smash Hits where he came up with the idea of sampling "Under Pressure":

Van Winkle described himself as the first rapper to cross into the pop market and said that although his pioneer status forced him to "take the heat for a lot of people" for his music's use of samples, the criticism he received over sample use allowed sampling to become acceptable in mainstream hip hop.

Release
"Ice Ice Baby" was initially released by Ichiban Records as the B-side to Van Winkle's cover of "Play That Funky Music". The 12-inch single featured the radio, instrumental and a cappella versions of "Play That Funky Music" and the radio version and "Miami Drop" remix of "Ice Ice Baby". When a disc jockey named David Morales played "Ice Ice Baby" instead of the single's A-side, the song gained more success than "Play That Funky Music". A music video for "Ice Ice Baby" was produced for $8000. The video was financed by Van Winkle's manager, Tommy Quon, and shot on the roof of a warehouse in Dallas, Texas. In the video, Van Winkle is shown rapping the lyrics while he and others dance to the song. Heavy airplay of the video by The Box while Van Winkle was still unknown increased public interest in the song. "Ice Ice Baby" was given its own single, released in 1990 by SBK Records in the United States, and EMI Records in the United Kingdom. The SBK single contained the "Miami Drop", instrumental and radio mixes of "Ice Ice Baby" and the album version of "It's a Party". The EMI single contained the club and radio mixes of the song, and the shortened radio edit.  The single was quickly pulled from the American market soon after the song reached number one, in a successful attempt to drive consumers to buy the album instead.

Reception
"Ice Ice Baby" garnered critical acclaim, was the first hip hop single to top the Billboard charts, and has been credited for helping diversify hip hop by introducing it to a mainstream audience.

Larry Flick from Billboard commented, "Photogenic white rapper rocks impressively over a sparse beat-bed that borrows heavily from Queen's "Under Pressure". Could pack a powerful multiformat punch." The Daily Vault's Christopher Thelen said it "did more for overexposure than New Coke did for soft drinks". Entertainment Weekly reviewer Mim Udovitch wrote that "[Vanilla Ice] probably would have scored with his hit rap single Ice Ice Baby even if he hadn't been white. There's just something about the way its hook – a sample from Queen and David Bowie's 'Under Pressure' — grabs you and flings you out onto the dance floor." Selina Webb from Music Week said, "Equally lacking in originality yet holding the same commercial appeal". She added, "The catchy part is borrowed from Queen's Under Pressure, the vocal is a cool white rap. Slightly more street cred than the New Kids, yet falling squarely into the same huge market." A reviewer from The Network Forty said that "like Mellow Man Ace, the rap melts slowly and is as much a mood piece as it is a cruising tune. A motocross champion from Dallas via Miami, the 22-year-old Ice says it's time to chill out."

Following the song's success, California rapper Mario "Chocolate" Johnson, an associate of record producer Suge Knight, claimed that he had helped in writing the song, and had not received credit or royalties. Knight and two bodyguards arrived at The Palm in West Hollywood, where Van Winkle was eating. After shoving Van Winkle's bodyguards aside, Knight and his own bodyguards sat down opposite Van Winkle, staring at him before finally asking "How you doin'?" Similar incidents were repeated several times before Knight showed up at Van Winkle's suite on the fifteenth floor of the Bel Age Hotel, accompanied by Johnson and a member of the Los Angeles Raiders. According to Van Winkle, Knight took him out on the balcony by himself, and implied that he would throw Van Winkle off unless he signed the rights to the song over to Knight.

Legacy
After audiences began to view Van Winkle as a novelty act and a pop star rather than a legitimate rapper, his popularity began to decline. Detroit-based rapper Eminem states that when he first heard "Ice Ice Baby", "I felt like I didn't want to rap anymore. I was so mad, because he was making it real hard for me." Van Winkle lost some credibility among hip hop fans, but later began to regain some success, attracting a new audience outside of the mainstream audience that had formerly accepted him and then rejected him. "Ice Ice Baby" continues to be the song that Van Winkle is best known for internationally, although Van Winkle states that his American fans like his newer music better.

According to Rolling Stone, the "Ice Ice Baby"–"Under Pressure" controversy is a landmark music copyright case since it "sparked discussion about the punitive actions taken in plagiarism cases". The magazine's Jordan Runtagh added: "Though [Vanilla Ice] paid the price, some argue that isn't enough to make up for the potential credibility lost by Queen and David Bowie, who are now linked to him through a collaboration they had no choice in joining."

A live version of the song appeared on the album Extremely Live. "Ice Ice Baby" was rerecorded in a nu metal version titled "Too Cold". Originally intended to be released as a hidden track or B-side, "Too Cold" was featured on Van Winkle's 1998 album Hard to Swallow, and received radio play in some markets. In 2000, a remix titled "Ice Ice Baby 2001" was released in Europe as a single, with a newly produced music video. The remix generated new international interest in Van Winkle's music.

VH1 and Blender ranked "Ice Ice Baby" fifth on its list of the "50 Most Awesomely Bad Songs Ever". It was also given the distinction by the Houston Press as being the worst song ever to emanate from Texas. In 1999, the song's music video was "retired" on the MTV special 25 Lame, in which Van Winkle himself appeared to destroy the video's master tape. Given a baseball bat, Van Winkle ended up destroying the show's set. However, in December 2007, VH1 ranked the song in 29th place of their 100 Greatest Songs of the 90's.

In November 2011, MTV Dance ranked "Ice Ice Baby" No. 71 in their list of "The 100 Biggest 90's Dance Anthems of All Time".

In 2019, Billboard listed it at No. 108 in their ranking of "Billboards Top Songs of the '90s".

In 1991, Alvin and the Chipmunks released a cover version entitled "Ice Ice Alvin" for their album The Chipmunks Rock the House. "Weird Al" Yankovic included the chorus as the final song in "Polka Your Eyes Out", the polka medley from his 1992 album Off the Deep End. In 2004, the song was featured in the film 13 Going on 30. In 2010, the song was featured in the Glee episode "Bad Reputation" as performed by Will Schuester (Matthew Morrison). In 2012, several references to the song were made in the film That's My Boy, where Van Winkle guest starred as himself - Donny Berger (Adam Sandler), an old friend of Van Winkle, asks him for money, claiming he should be "loaded" with the royalties he receives from the song; however, Van Winkle tells him that "Queen took 50 percent, Suge took the other 60 percent, I f***ing owe money when that sh*t gets played, man!" Later on, Berger and Van Winkle drive in Van Winkle's Ford Mustang 5.0, a reference to the car he drove in the music video (but not the same car), then listen to the song on Van Winkle's Walkman as they run.

Track listings

1990 release

 7" single
 "Ice Ice Baby" (radio mix)  – 4:29
 "Ice Ice Baby" (radio mix edit)  – 3:49

 12" maxi – US
 "Ice Ice Baby" (radio mix)  – 4:28
 "Ice Ice Baby" (Miami drop mix)  – 4:59
 "Play That Funky Music" (radio mix)  – 4:39
 "Play That Funky Music" (instrumental mix)  – 4:36
 "Play That Funky Music" (a cappella mix)  – 4:32

 12" maxi / CD maxi – US
 "Ice Ice Baby" (radio mix)  – 4:28
 "Ice Ice Baby" (Miami drop mix)  – 4:59
 "Ice Ice Baby" (Miami drop instrumental)  – 4:59
 "Ice Ice Baby" (a cappella mix)  – 3:46
 "Play That Funky Music" (radio mix)  – 4:39
 "Play That Funky Music" (instrumental mix)  – 4:36
 "Play That Funky Music" (a cappella mix)  – 4:32

 CD maxi – Europe
 "Ice Ice Baby" (radio edit)  – 3:46
 "Ice Ice Baby" (Miami drop mix)  – 5:00
 "Play That Funky Music" (radio mix)  – 4:41

 12" maxi – Europe
 "Ice Ice Baby" (club mix)  – 5:02
 "Ice Ice Baby" (radio mix)  – 4:30
 "Ice Ice Baby" (radio mix edit)  – 3:49

 12" maxi – UK
 "Ice Ice Baby" (Miami drop mix)  – 4:58
 "Ice Ice Baby" (instrumental mix)  – 4:59
 "It's a Party"  – 4:39
 "Ice Ice Baby" (radio mix)  – 4:28

 Cassette
 "Ice Ice Baby" (radio edit)  – 3:46
 "It's a Party"  – 4:39
 "Ice Ice Baby" (radio edit)  – 3:46
 "It's a Party"  – 4:39

 German CD maxi
 "Ice Ice Baby" (Miami Drop Mix)
 "Ice Ice Baby" (Acapella Mix)
 "Ice Ice Baby" (Miami Drop Mix Instrumental)
 "Play That Funky Music" (Acapella Mix)

2001 remixes
 12" maxi
 "Ice Ice Baby 2001" (Gigi D'Agostino remix)  – 7:17
 "Ice Ice Baby 2001" (Funky 9ers club dub)  – 4:53
 "Ice Ice Baby 2001" (House of Wax club-mix)  – 6:06
 "Ice Ice Baby 2001" (Debart Style re-e-mix)  – 6:42

 CD maxi
 "Ice Ice Baby 2001" (House of Wax radio-mix)  – 3:36
 "Ice Ice Baby 2001" (Gigi D'Agostino remix-edit)  – 3:45
 "Ice Ice Baby 2001" (Silverwater & Shaw remix)  – 3:42
 "Ice Ice Baby 2001" (Prepay remix)  – 3:54
 "Ice Ice Baby 2001" (Steve Baltes remix)  – 3:53
 "Everytime (album version) (feat. 4BY4) – 3:58

2008 remixes
 12" maxi
 "Ice Ice Baby 2008" (Mondo Electro remix)
 "Ice Ice Baby 2008" (7th Heaven House remix)
 "Ice Ice Baby 2008" (Rico NL Jumpstyle remix)
 "Ice Ice Baby 2008" (Mendezz and Andrew remix)

Charts

Weekly charts

Year-end charts

Certifications

See also
U Can't Touch This, 1990 sample of 1981 Super Freak
Under Pressure (Ice Ice Baby)

References

External links

1989 songs
1990 singles
Vanilla Ice songs
Billboard Hot 100 number-one singles
Cashbox number-one singles
Number-one singles in Australia
European Hot 100 Singles number-one singles
Number-one singles in New Zealand
Number-one singles in Zimbabwe
Irish Singles Chart number-one singles
UK Singles Chart number-one singles
Sampling controversies
Songs written by Vanilla Ice
Songs written by Freddie Mercury
Songs written by Brian May
Songs written by John Deacon
Songs written by Roger Taylor (Queen drummer)
Songs written by David Bowie
Songs involved in royalties controversies
SBK Records singles
EMI Records singles